Svartsot is a Danish folk metal band formed in 2005 in Randers.

History
On 17 December 2008 Michael Lundquist Andersen, Niels Thøgersen, Claus B. Gnudtzmann and Martin Kielland-Brandt announced they had left the band because of different opinions on how to run a band and how the music should sound.  The band's whistler, Stewart Lewis, is currently on a hiatus due to the continuing state of his wife’s ill health.  On 22 February 2009 Svartsot announced their new band lineup was complete.  Stewart Lewis was replaced for live shows, but was still considered a member of the band for some time.

In 2010, the band released a new album, Mulmets Viser, through Napalm Records. Despite Cristoffer J.S. Frederiksen being the only remaining member of the previous lineup, his position as the band's guitarist, composer and lyricist ensured that the band retained its musical identity. Mulmets Viser garnered a fairly positive critical response, although several critics pointed out that the band's strict adherence to their particular formula resulted in the album gradually losing listeners' attention as it progressed.

Band members

Current
 Thor Bager - vocals
 Hans-Jørgen Martinus Hansen - Irish whistles, mandolin, bagpipes and previously also accordion
 Cristoffer J.S. Frederiksen - lead guitar, mandolin, acoustic guitar
 Michael Alm - rhythm guitar
 Frederik Uglebjerg - drums
 Simon Buje - bass

Former
 James Atkin - bass
 Stewart C. Lewis - Irish whistles, bodhran, axes and other instruments
 Danni Jelsgaard - drums
 Michael Lundquist Andersen - guitar
 Niels Thøgersen - drums
 Claus B. Gnudtzmann - vocals
 Martin Kielland-Brandt - bass
 Cliff Nemanim - rhythm guitars
 Marcello Freitas - drums
 Henrik S. Christensen - bass

Discography

Studio albums
 Ravnenes Saga (2007)
 Mulmets Viser  (2010)
 Maledictus Eris (2011)
 Vældet (2015)
 Kumbl (2022)

Demos
 Svundne Tider (2006)
 Tvende Ravne (2007)

References

External links

 
 Their MySpace page

Danish folk metal musical groups
Musical groups established in 2005
Napalm Records artists